Malta took part at the Eurovision Song Contest 1993 in Millstreet, Ireland. Their entry was singer William Mangion with the song "This Time".

Before Eurovision

National final 
The final was held on 13 March 1993 at the Mediterranean Conference Centre in Valletta, hosted by John Demanuele and Marija Bugeja. The songs were firstly performed in Maltese, then in English. Only the top 3 were announced.

At Eurovision
William Mangion performed 8th on the night of the contest, following Belgium and preceding Iceland. At the close of the voting the song had received 66 points, placing 8th of 25.

Voting

References

External links
Maltese National Final 1993

1993
Countries in the Eurovision Song Contest 1993
Eurovision